Captain Samuel Mathews (c. 1580 – November 30, 1657) was a Virginia planter, political figure, and the father of Governor Samuel Mathews (Colonial Virginia governor).

Biography

Born in England, Matthews was the first of the family to emigrate from England to The New World, arriving at Jamestown by 1619. He established a plantation, "Mathews Manor", later known as Denbigh, which was located on the north side of the James River at Blunt Point, the confluence of the Warwick and the James rivers in the area which later became Warwick County, Virginia (and which is now within the city limits of Newport News).
He eventually had several other land holdings, including one near Henricus and another at Old Point Comfort. Known as Colonel Mathews, the elder Samuel became one of the most prominent men in the colony. By 1621 he was a member of the Governor's Council and was actively involved in conflicts with the Native Americans. In 1635, he was one of the leaders of the popular mutiny that ousted Royal Governor Sir John Harvey. In the spring of 1637 Mathews and three others were sent home to England to stand trial for treason in the Court of Star Chamber, but the charges were eventually dropped and Mathews returned to Virginia in 1639. Upon returning to England, the elder Mathews was eventually cleared of any charges; upon returning to Virginia, he resumed service on the Governor's Council until 1644.

Frances Grevill was one of four women who arrived at Jamestown from Bristol, England in September 1620 aboard the ship, Supply. She was first married to Captain Nathaniel West, brother of Thomas West, the third Lord Delaware, who had been governor of Virginia beginning in 1610. After West's death several years later, Grevill married Abraham Peirsey, a wealthy man who had purchased Sir George Yeardley's Flowerdew Hundred Plantation after his death. Peirsey died several years later. Twice widowed, but with considerable legacies, she next married Samuel Mathews.

They had two sons Samuel, and Francis (1632–1673). Francis, a tobacco planter had a large estate of some two thousand acres in Northumberland County.

Mathews served in London as the Colony's representative in handling disputes, particularly in the matter of establishing the border with Maryland. Much of his influence has been attributed to his second marriage to the daughter of Sir Thomas Hinton whose son was a gentleman of the king's Privy Chamber. Mathews died in London, England on November 30, 1657.

As a member of the House of Burgesses, Matthews was viewed as an "honest, energetic and faithful servant of the Colony" whose death was "universally lamented."

Mathews Manor
Captain Mathews built the Manor around 1626. 
The site of Mathews Manor, located within the independent city of Newport News, Virginia, was the subject of an archeological study led by Colonial Williamsburg's Ivor Noel Hume in the 1960s, and was placed on the National Park Service's National Register of Historic Places.

See also
Colony of Virginia
Governor's Palace
List of colonial governors of Virginia
History of Virginia

References

1657 deaths
House of Burgesses members
Virginia colonial people
Year of birth uncertain